The 1972–73 Philadelphia Blazers season was the first season of the Blazers' franchise in the World Hockey Association. It would also be the only season of the Blazers in Philadelphia, as the team relocated to Vancouver for the following season. The Blazers finished third and qualified for the playoffs losing in the first round to the Cleveland Crusaders.

Offseason

Regular season

Final standings

Game log

Playoffs

Cleveland Crusaders 4, Philadelphia Blazers 0 - Semifinals

Player stats 

Note: Pos = Position; GP = Games played; G = Goals; A = Assists; Pts = Points; +/- = plus/minus; PIM = Penalty minutes; PPG = Power-play goals; SHG = Short-handed goals; GWG = Game-winning goals
      MIN = Minutes played; W = Wins; L = Losses; T = Ties; GA = Goals-against; GAA = Goals-against average; SO = Shutouts;

Awards and records

Awards

Transactions

Trades

Draft picks 
Philadelphia's picks at the WHA General Player Draft, which was held in Anaheim, California on February 12–13, 1972. The team participated in the draft as the Miami Screaming Eagles.

Farm teams 
The Roanoke Valley Rebels in the EHL.

See also 
 1972–73 WHA season

References

External links 

Phil
Phil